The American Woolen Company Townhouses are a collection of brick townhouses built c. 1907 by the American Woolen Company in Lawrence, Massachusetts.  They were part of a program of company-built housing between 1906 and 1910 that included the nearby American Woolen Mill Housing District.  The townhouses are located on a series of short streets off Market Street in South Lawrence.  A historic district comprising these six buildings was listed on the National Register of Historic Places in 2012.

The lot has been divided into three sections, each of which contains two townhouses facing each other across a central private road (Wood Way, Washington Way, and Prospect Way). The short ends of the townhouses face Market Street. When originally built the central areas provided foot access to the units, but they have been paved over and are now used for parking.

The six buildings are identical in all major details, and were designed by local architect James E. Allen. Each unit presents  of frontage into the central area. There are minor variations in the front facades of the units. In some cases the entries of adjacent units are paired, and some entries or entry pairs are sheltered by a pilastered pediment. The rear of all units was substantially identical: a recessed porch, set under a segmented arch, provided access to the unit's back door.

See also
National Register of Historic Places listings in Lawrence, Massachusetts
National Register of Historic Places listings in Essex County, Massachusetts

References

Historic districts in Essex County, Massachusetts
National Register of Historic Places in Lawrence, Massachusetts
Historic districts on the National Register of Historic Places in Massachusetts
American Woolen Company
Company housing